Sahqaya (also, Shakh-Kaya) is a village in Baku, Azerbaijan.

References 

Populated places in Baku